Žeimiai is a village in Varėna district municipality, in Alytus County, southeastern Lithuania. According to the 2001 census, the village has a population of 70 people. It is situated on the left bank of the Neman River in Dzūkija National Park.

References

Villages in Alytus County
Varėna District Municipality